Pancoenia is a genus of moth in the family Gelechiidae.

Species
 Pancoenia pelota Meyrick, 1904
 Pancoenia periphora Meyrick, 1904
 Pancoenia pygmaea Turner, 1919

References

Gelechiinae